STV News is a Scottish news division produced by STV. The news department produces two regional services covering STV's Channel 3 franchise areas of Northern and Central Scotland.

STV's news programmes are produced from studios in Glasgow, Edinburgh and Aberdeen with reporters also based at newsrooms in Dundee and Inverness and political correspondents based at Holyrood and Westminster. Freelance correspondents and camera crews are based on the Orkney and Shetland Isles, Wick and Fort William with a permanent Western Isles correspondent based in Stornoway.

In addition to its daily bulletins and online services, STV News also produces the current affairs programme Scotland Tonight along with feature documentaries.

Broadcast

Two separate editions of STV News at Six air on STV Central and STV North each weeknight at 6:00 pm. ITV Evening News, the networked news programme, follows at 6:30 pm.

The main evening programmes are supplemented by shorter STV News bulletins seven days a week:
Good Morning Scotland (not to be confused with the BBC Radio Scotland programme of the same name) updates for the North and Central regions during Good Morning Britain at around 6:10am, 7:10am and 8:10am each weekday. Both bulletins are broadcast from Glasgow.
Lunchtime bulletins for the North and Central regions at 1:55pm each weekday, following the ITV Lunchtime News.
Late news bulletins for the North and Central regions at 10:30pm each weeknight, following ITV News at Ten.
Weekend bulletins, broadcast across all regions from Glasgow – one on Saturday evenings, one on Sunday evenings.

In the Central region, STV News at Six is presented jointly from STV's Glasgow and Edinburgh studios. The programme includes opt-outs for separate news, sport and weather for the East and West of the region.

In the North, viewers in Tayside and northeast Fife receive a separate 5-minute bulletin during the main STV News at Six each weeknight, presented and produced from STV's studios at Seabraes in Dundee and directed from a technical gallery in Aberdeen. While the Tayside bulletin is broadcast, viewers further north see more news from the north-east, Highlands and Islands, broadcast from the main studio in Aberdeen.

All North, East and pan-regional bulletins are broadcast one hour after their original airing on STV +1. Bulletins are also available for catch-up for 1 day after broadcast on the STV Player website.

Digital 
STV News operates a digital news service via its website and mobile apps.  It has a dedicated team digital staff working on their website, creating original journalism and collaborating with journalists in the news teams in Glasgow, Edinburgh, Aberdeen, Dundee and Inverness.

Overview
STV News at Six launched on Monday 23 March 2009 as part of a major station revamp. The nightly news programmes were previously known as Scotland Today in the STV Central region and North Tonight in the STV North region, with both programmes carrying local opt-outs from January 2007 onwards.

Previously in the Central region, viewers in the West and East areas received 5-minute bulletins within the main 6pm programme – STV News West covered the area from Tobermory to Falkirk, with the presenter based in the main studio in Glasgow. Meanwhile, STV News East covered the area from Anstruther to Dunbar and was presented and produced at STV's Edinburgh studios. The full-length separate STV News at Six programmes for the two areas were launched on Monday 23 May 2011.

STV2 national news
On Monday 2 June 2014, a secondary news service, STV Glasgow News, was launched as part of the local television channel STV Glasgow. This was followed by the launch of a news service for STV Edinburgh on Monday 12 January.

Both channels were merged with new local TV services for Aberdeen, Ayr and Dundee in April 2017 to form STV2, providing national news bulletins throughout the day with half-hour programmes at 1pm and 10pm on weekdays.

In September 2016, STV announced it would launch a news programme combining Scottish, UK and international news coverage. STV News Tonight was produced and broadcast from Glasgow using STV's resources from across Scotland and the UK and international resources of ITN. The half-hour programme, launched on Monday 24 April 2017, was presented by Halla Mohieddeen and aired each weeknight at 7pm on STV2.

Cutbacks
On 16 May 2018, STV announced 59 redundancies, including 34 from its news division. STV2 ceased broadcasting at the end of June 2018, marking the end of STV News Tonight and the station's national news service.

On STV itself, the Edinburgh-based edition of STV News at Six was axed and replaced with shorter opt-outs within a Central Scotland programme. STV North's regional news services were not affected, although nine jobs – three journalists and six technical posts – were lost at the company's Aberdeen studios.

NUJ members at STV voted in favour of strike action against the job cuts, although the union decided against immediate action after the company ruled out compulsory redundancies.

The last edition of STV News Tonight aired on Friday 29 June 2018, followed by the final East edition of STV News at Six on Friday 7 September 2018.

The team

Main anchors

References

External links

 
2010s British television series
2020s British television series
2009 British television series debuts
2009 establishments in Scotland
English-language television shows
ITV regional news shows
Scottish television news shows
 1